David Bonderman (born November 27, 1942) is an American billionaire businessman. He is the founding partner of TPG Capital (formerly Texas Pacific Group), and its Asian affiliate, Newbridge Capital. He is also one of the minority owners of the NBA's Boston Celtics as well as the co-founder and co-majority owner (along with Jerry Bruckheimer) of the Seattle Kraken of the National Hockey League. , he has an estimated net worth of US$4.5 billion.

Early life and education
Bonderman was born to a Jewish family, in Los Angeles on November 27, 1942, and was educated there at University High School. Bonderman studied at the University of Washington, where he graduated Phi Beta Kappa in 1963, and at Harvard Law School, where he graduated magna cum laude in 1966. He was also a member of the Harvard Law Review and a Sheldon Fellow. During his time at Harvard, he traveled to Cairo, Egypt, to study Islamic Legal Jurisprudence and Law, and became proficient in various Islamic legal cliques developing a near-native fluency in Modern Standard Arabic. Bonderman began providing the funding for the Bonderman Travel Fellowship at the University of Washington in 1995 which gives eight undergraduate and six graduate students per year with the opportunity to travel the world independently, with very little structure or regulations. In 2013, Bonderman's daughter, Samantha Holloway, donated the funding to create a similar fellowship at the University of Michigan. While the fellowships share the same name (the Bonderman Fellowship), they vary in both eligibility and execution.

Career
Bonderman was an assistant professor at Tulane University Law School during 1967 and 1968; he then was a special assistant to the United States Attorney General during 1968 and 1969. In 1971, he joined the law firm of Arnold & Porter in Washington, D.C., where he became a partner and specialized in corporate, securities, bankruptcy and antitrust litigation. In 1983, he joined the Robert M. Bass Group, Inc. (RMBG), which now does business as Keystone Inc., and became the chief operating officer. Bonderman has been a principal at TPG Capital in Fort Worth, Texas, since December 1992, where he is also co-founder and chairman.

In 2008, Bonderman was named as one of the investors of what became the T-Mobile Arena in Las Vegas.

Bonderman was a director of Continental Airlines, Böwe Bell & Howell, Ducati Motor Holding S.p.A., Credicom Asia, the National Education Corp., Beringer Wine Estates, Carr Realty, Virgin Cinemas, CoStar Group, Gemalto, and Ryanair. He is on the boards of The Wilderness Society, the Grand Canyon Trust, the World Wide Fund for Nature, The University of Washington Foundation and the American Himalayan Foundation. He previously served on the boards of Washington Mutual, American Savings Bank, Denbury Resources and Burger King. He was a board member of Uber until he resigned from that position in June 2017.

In June 2017, Bonderman resigned from the board of Uber amidst controversy surrounding a sexist response to fellow board member Arianna Huffington during a company all-hands meeting. "There’s a lot of data that shows when there’s one woman on the board, it’s much more likely that there will be a second woman on the board," said Huffington. Bonderman replied, "actually, what it shows is that it's much more likely to be more talking." The Uber meeting was, among other things, slated to discuss efforts to rein in a toxic and sexist culture at the company.

In 2018, Bonderman filed an application for a National Hockey League (NHL) expansion team to play at a renovated Key Arena in Seattle, Washington. The NHL Board of Governors voted to approve the team, named the Seattle Kraken, on December 4.

Wildcat, Infinity Q, Velissaris 
Wildcat Capital Management was originally Bonderman's family office. In early 2019, a mutual fund named Infinity Q Diversified Alpha Fund had reportedly said on its website that the "investment team and control functions are largely the same for both Wildcat and Infinity Q." Wildcat also reportedly had $100 million invested in the fund. Infinity Q had been founded in 2014. In early 2021, the $1.7 billion Infinity Q fund suspended redemptions, the SEC was investigating asset valuations and the chief investment officer, James Velissaris, had been placed on administrative leave. Leonard Potter, Infinity Q's non-executive chairman and owner of Wildcat, was designated to take over Infinity Q's management. Wildcat "managed more than $3 billion at the end of 2019, including capital from Bonderman." In February 2021, SEC charged Velissaris in a fraudulent scheme to overvalue assets held by the Infinity Q Diversified Alpha mutual fund and the Infinity Q Volatility Alpha private fund. According to the complaint, Velissaris collected more than $26 million through fraudulent conduct, deceived SEC staff by creating backdated minutes non-existent valuation meetings, and altering valuation policy documents. The U.S. Attorney’s Office for the Southern District of New York announced criminal charges against Velissaris, and the Commodity Futures Trading Commission (CFTC) announced parallel civil charges against him.

In April 2021, the Wall Street Journal analyzed specific valuation problems in the fund portfolios and received some comment on them. It also reported an apparent loss of $500 million in the fund, bringing valuation to $1.2 billion, and some discussion of the loss. Velissaris was identified as having been majority owner and in control of the fund with Bonderman family investment interests as passive investors in it. Infinity Q was expected to present a plan to distribute funds to investors by May 24, the report concluded.

Personal life
Bonderman is married to Dr. Laurie Michaels; they have five children, and live in Fort Worth, Texas.

In 2002, for his 60th birthday, Bonderman had The Rolling Stones and John Mellencamp play at his birthday party at The Joint at Hard Rock Hotel and Casino in Las Vegas. John Mellencamp played for an hour, The Rolling Stones played for an hour and a half, and comedian Robin Williams entertained guests between acts. The party cost $7 million, making it one of the most expensive private concerts ever held.

In 2012, for his 70th birthday party, Bonderman held a private concert by former The Beatles member Paul McCartney at Wynn Las Vegas for 1,020 guests. Robin Williams also performed a comedy routine. Bonderman donated $1000 to each guest's charity of choice.

Awards and honors
1999, Golden Plate Award of the American Academy of Achievement
2004, The M&A Advisor Hall of Fame
2016, Woodrow Wilson Award for Corporate Citizenship
2017, Texas Business Hall of Fame

References

Further reading

External links
 

1942 births
Living people
20th-century American businesspeople
21st-century American businesspeople
American billionaires
American chief executives of financial services companies
American financial company founders
American financiers
American investors
American sports businesspeople
Arnold & Porter people
Businesspeople from Los Angeles
Businesspeople from Texas
Businesspeople from Washington, D.C.
Corporate lawyers
Harvard Law School alumni
Jewish American attorneys
Jewish American philanthropists
Lawyers from Washington, D.C.
National Hockey League owners
Private equity and venture capital investors
Seattle Kraken owners
TPG Capital
Tulane University faculty
Tulane University Law School faculty
University High School (Los Angeles) alumni
University of Washington alumni
21st-century American Jews